Live is a live album by Gary Moore, recorded over two nights in 1980 at the Marquee Club in London. For the recording, Moore enlisted former Lone Star frontman, Kenny Driscoll to provide lead vocals (Driscoll's replacement in Lone Star, John Sloman, would later perform with Moore), Andy Pyle of The Kinks to play bass, former Black Oak Arkansas and Pat Travers drummer Tommy Aldridge, and Moore's former  Colosseum II bandmate, keyboardist Don Airey, who would go on to contribute to many of Moore's later solo works.

The performance mainly showcases material from Moore's 1979 solo album Back on the Streets and his ill-fated G-Force project, with two songs being from Dirty Fingers, and the remaining track, "Dallas Warhead" being an original composition, which incorporates a drum solo from Aldridge.

This album was first released in Japan in 1983 along with the Dirty Fingers album by Sony Records who bought the copyright from Jet Records. There have been several subsequent releases under the title Live at the Marquee "licensed" by Jet Records. On 23 October 2000, Sanctuary Records released a remastered CD version, containing no additional material.

Track listing
All songs written by Gary Moore, except where indicated.

Side one
"Back on the Streets" – 5:29
"Run to Your Mama" – 5:19
"Dancin'" (Moore, Mark Nauseef, Tony Newton, Willie Dee) – 5:38
"She's Got You" (Moore, Nauseef) – 7:12

Side two
"Parisienne Walkways" (instrumental version) (Moore, Phil Lynott) – 7:45
"You" – 4:28
"Nuclear Attack" – 5:09
"Dallas Warhead" (instrumental) – 9:58

Personnel
Gary Moore – guitar, backing vocals
Kenny Driscoll – lead vocals
Don Airey – keyboards
Andy Pyle – bass
Tommy Aldridge – drums, percussion

Production
Chris Tsangarides – producer, engineer

References 

1983 live albums
Albums produced by Chris Tsangarides
Gary Moore live albums
Jet Records live albums
Live albums recorded at The Marquee Club